Eric Paslay is the self-titled debut studio album by American country music artist Eric Paslay. It was released on February 4, 2014 via EMI Nashville. The album includes the singles "Never Really Wanted", "Friday Night", "Song About a Girl" and "She Don't Love You".

Critical reception

The eponymously titled album Eric Paslay garnered critical acclaim from five music critics. At USA Today, Brian Mansfield rated the album three-and-a-half stars out of four, stating that he held back some excellent material for himself on which "His sweet-as-Southern-tea debut finds common ground between radio-friendly and flat-out brilliant, incorporating a sense of both spirituality and '80s pop." Tammy Ragusa of Country Weekly graded the album an A, writing that the album "hosts a heap of winners." In addition, Ragusa says that "The gifted songwriter has done an incredible job of showcasing his ability to create a collection that leans away from lyrical trends and toward depth and texture [...] reveal[ing] the complexity of an accomplished artist, and retains the purity of solid country music." At The Oakland Press, Gary Graff rated the album three out of four stars, calling this "A strong debut from an established name on the scene." Steve Leggett of AllMusic rated the album three-and-a-half out of five stars, noting how Paslay on the release "keep[s] it simple and catchy", but this means that the music "doesn't change the landscape of contemporary country, but it sure recognizes it, and that's Paslay's songwriting strength." At Roughstock, Matt Bjorke rated the album a perfect five stars, saying that the release "showcases an artist who deserves to be placed on the same songwriting field as singer/songwriters like Rodney Crowell, John Hiatt, Jackson Browne and JD Souther with a little bit of The Band thrown in for good measure." Also, Bjorke states that "There isn’t a bad song to be found on Eric Paslay and it truly is an early contender for the best Country Album of 2014."

Track listing

Personnel
Jessi Alexander- background vocals
Marshall Altman- Fender Rhodes, percussion, piano, programming, background vocals
Bruce Bouton- steel guitar
Tom Bukovac- electric guitar
Jake Campbell- electric guitar
Chad Cromwell- drums
Karen Fairchild- background vocals
Shannon Forrest- drums
Tony Harrell- Hammond B-3 organ, piano
Aubrey Haynie- mandolin
Natalie Hemby- background vocals 
Daniel Hill- drums, percussion
Jedd Hughes- electric guitar
Troy Lancaster- acoustic guitar, electric guitar
Tim Lauer- Hammond B-3 organ, keyboards, piano
Tony Lucido- bass guitar
Pat McGrath- banjo, acoustic guitar
Rob McNelley- electric guitar
Jerry McPherson- electric guitar
Greg Morrow- drums
Eric Paslay- acoustic guitar, electric guitar, hammer dulcimer, lead vocals, background vocals
Dave Pomeroy- bass guitar
Alison Prestwood- bass guitar
Mike Rojas- keyboards
Kimberly Schlapman- background vocals
Adam Shoenfeld- electric guitar
Phillip Sweet- background vocals
Russell Terrell- background vocals
Ilya Toshinsky- banjo, hi-string guitar, mandolin
Jimi Westbrook- background vocals
Jonathan Yudkin- fiddle, mandolin

Chart performance

Album
The album debuted on Billboard 200 at No. 31, and No. 4 in the Top Country Albums chart, selling 11,000 copies in the US. As of February 2015, the album has sold 54,300 copies in the U.S.

Singles

References

2014 debut albums
Eric Paslay albums
EMI Records albums
Albums produced by Marshall Altman